Michael Ross is an Australian former professional rugby league footballer who played in the 1960s and 1970s.  He played for Balmain in the New South Wales Rugby League (NSWRL) competition.

Background
In 1964 Ross captained the Tamworth High School First XIII to win the University Shield (NSW Combined High Schools competition) and the NSW State Championship (All Schools). After high school, he moved to Sydney to study and play for the Balmain club.

Playing career
Ross made his New South Wales Rugby League first grade debut for Balmain in 1966, last playing in 1973, having appeared in the top grade in all seasons, except 1970.  From 1974 to 1978 he played for the Ballina Seagulls.

Post playing
Ross taught economics at Ballina High School. 
In 2008 he was named at Fullback in the Ballina Seagulls Team of the Century.

References

Sources
 
 

1946 births
Living people
Australian rugby league players
Ballina Seagulls players
Balmain Tigers players
People from Tamworth, New South Wales
Rugby league players from Sydney
Rugby league fullbacks